The 2004 CFL season is considered to be the 51st season in modern-day Canadian football, although it is officially the 47th Canadian Football League season.

CFL News in 2004
Neil Payne retired from his position as Director of Officiating in February and was replaced by George Black. Former Eskimos Head Coach, Tom Higgins was named as the 2003 Coach of the Year. CFL Commissioner Tom E. Wright, announced that Vancouver would host the 93rd Grey Cup for 2005. Furthermore, CFL Commissioner Tom E. Wright also announced in late October, that Winnipeg would be the host of the 94th Grey Cup for 2006.

Wayne Smith of Appalachian State University was drafted first overall in the 2004 CFL Draft by the Hamilton Tiger-Cats. Former player, broadcaster and football administrator, Mike Wadsworth died in April. In September, the Canadian Football Hall of Fame inducted Larry Highbaugh, Cal Murphy, Lui Passaglia, Dan Yochum and Ben Zambiasi during the Induction Weekend ceremonies in Hamilton.

CFL partner, Sun Microsystems added and launched real-time, in-game statistics entry with live play-by-play and scoring on cfl.ca. On June 2, the CFL announced a partnership with FSN and launched a player-based and team-based game for the 2004 season. In addition, the CFL also launched its first ever online kids section called — the Dare CFL KidsZone.

The CFL started a new international broadcasting agreement with Trajectory Sports & Media Group, to deliver Canadian Football to more than 50 million households in 176 countries for the 2004 season. U.S. television coverage of the 92nd Grey Cup resulted in the largest international broadcast distribution of a Grey Cup game — when it was made available to more than 55 million television households. In addition, Rogers Sportsnet announced the start of "CFL Crunch", which is a 30-minute news segment concerning the league on June 24.

On October 18, the Toronto Argonauts announced their agreement with York University, to construct a new 25,000-seat stadium on the university's Keele campus.

League attendance increased by 8% over the 2003 season, when more than 2.2 million fans were coming into CFL stadiums. The BC Lions home attendance figures increased by 13% over the 2003 season, by averaging about 26,697 fans per game at BC Place Stadium. The Montreal Alouettes continued their strong attendance figures by recording its fifth straight year of having sell out crowds at both, Percival Molson Memorial Stadium and Olympic Stadium. The CFL set a new playoff attendance record with a total of 181,717 postseason crowds attending playoff games in Toronto, Edmonton, Montreal, Vancouver and Ottawa. The Grey Cup game in Ottawa had a sell-out crowd of 51,242 at Frank Clair Stadium.

The attendance increases were likely caused at least in part by the lack of NHL hockey in the wake of the 2004–05 NHL lockout.

Records: Before he retired, Edmonton running back, Mike Pringle, established two new records in 2004. The first record was accomplished on July 12, when Pringle established a new CFL career record for yards from scrimmage with 20,254 yards in the Eskimos 25–9 win over the B.C. Lions. The second record was accomplished on September 19 against the same B.C. Lions, when Pringle became the all-time leading rusher in CFL history with 16,425 yards.

In addition, three CFL quarterbacks established new records as well. Edmonton's Jason Maas, entered the CFL record books by setting a new mark for most consecutive pass completions in a regular season game with 22 on July 30. On August 13, B.C.'s Casey Printers, sets a new CFL record for the highest pass completion percentage in a regular season game by completing 90.9% of his passes. Furthermore, Hamilton's Danny McManus, joined the company of Damon Allen and Ron Lancaster by surpassing the milestone of passing for 50,000 or more career yards on October 21.

The Montreal Alouettes became the first team in CFL history to have four receivers on one team reach the 1000-yard receiving mark in one season: Ben Cahoon (1183 yards), Jeremaine Copeland (1154 yards), Thyron Anderson (1147 yards), and Kwame Cavil (1090 yards)

The Toronto Argonauts won their 15th Grey Cup by defeating the B.C. Lions 27–19 on November 21.

Regular season standings

Final regular season standings
Note: GP = Games Played, W = Wins, L = Losses, T = Ties, PF = Points For, PA = Points Against, Pts = Points

Bold text means that they have clinched the playoffs.
BC and Montreal both have first round byes.

Grey Cup playoffs

The Toronto Argonauts are the 2004 Grey Cup Champions, defeating the BC Lions 27–19, at Ottawa's Frank Clair Stadium.  It was the first Grey Cup for Toronto since the 85th Grey Cup in 1997.
The Argonauts' Damon Allen (QB) was named the Grey Cup's Most Valuable Player and the Lions' Jason Clermont (SB) was the Grey Cup's Most Valuable Canadian.

Playoff bracket

*-Team won in Overtime.

CFL Leaders
 CFL Passing Leaders
 CFL Rushing Leaders
 CFL Receiving Leaders

2004 CFL All-Stars

Offence
QB – Casey Printers, BC Lions
RB – Troy Davis, Hamilton Tiger-Cats
RB – Charles Roberts, Winnipeg Blue Bombers
SB – Ben Cahoon, Montreal Alouettes
SB – Geroy Simon, BC Lions
WR – D. J. Flick, Hamilton Tiger-Cats
WR – Jason Tucker, Edmonton Eskimos
C – Bryan Chiu, Montreal Alouettes
OG – Paul Lambert, Montreal Alouettes
OG – Andrew Greene, Saskatchewan Roughriders
OT – Uzooma Okeke, Montreal Alouettes
OT – Gene Makowsky, Saskatchewan Roughriders

Defence
DT – Noah Cantor, Toronto Argonauts
DT – Nate Davis, Saskatchewan Roughriders
DE – Tim Cheatwood, Hamilton Tiger-Cats
DE – Anwar Stewart, Montreal Alouettes
LB – John Grace, Calgary Stampeders
LB – Kevin Eiben, Toronto Argonauts
LB – Barrin Simpson, BC Lions
CB – Almondo Curry, Montreal Alouettes
CB – Malcolm Frank, Edmonton Eskimos
DB – Eddie Davis, Saskatchewan Roughriders
DB – Clifford Ivory, Toronto Argonauts
DS – Orlondo Steinauer, Toronto Argonauts

Special teams
P – Noel Prefontaine, Toronto Argonauts
K – Sean Fleming, Edmonton Eskimos
ST – Keith Stokes, Winnipeg Blue Bombers

2004 Western All-Stars

Offence
QB – Casey Printers, BC Lions
RB – Kenton Keith, Saskatchewan Roughriders
RB – Charles Roberts, Winnipeg Blue Bombers
SB – Jason Clermont, BC Lions
SB – Geroy Simon, BC Lions
WR – Ryan Thelwell, BC Lions
WR – Jason Tucker, Edmonton Eskimos
C – Angus Reid, BC Lions
OG – Jay McNeil, Calgary Stampeders
OG – Andrew Greene, Saskatchewan Roughriders
OT – Seth Dittman, Calgary Stampeders
OT – Gene Makowsky, Saskatchewan Roughriders

Defence
DT – Joe Fleming, Calgary Stampeders
DT – Nate Davis, Saskatchewan Roughriders
DE – Brent Johnson, BC Lions
DE – Tom Canada, Winnipeg Blue Bombers
LB – John Grace, Calgary Stampeders
LB – Reggie Hunt, Saskatchewan Roughriders
LB – Barrin Simpson, BC Lions
DB – Wes Lysack, Winnipeg Blue Bombers
DB – Malcolm Frank, Edmonton Eskimos
DB – Eddie Davis, Saskatchewan Roughriders
DB – Joey Boese, Calgary Stampeders
DS – Sam Young, BC Lions

Special teams
P – Sean Fleming, Edmonton Eskimos
K – Sean Fleming, Edmonton Eskimos
ST – Keith Stokes, Winnipeg Blue Bombers

2004 Eastern All-Stars

Offence
QB – Anthony Calvillo, Montreal Alouettes
RB – Troy Davis, Hamilton Tiger-Cats
RB – Josh Ranek, Ottawa Renegades
SB – Ben Cahoon, Montreal Alouettes
SB – Jeremaine Copeland, Montreal Alouettes
WR – D. J. Flick, Hamilton Tiger-Cats
WR – Kwame Cavil, Montreal Alouettes
C – Bryan Chiu, Montreal Alouettes
OG – Paul Lambert, Montreal Alouettes
OG – Scott Flory, Montreal Alouettes
OT – Uzooma Okeke, Montreal Alouettes
OT – Dave Hack, Hamilton Tiger-Cats

Defence
DT – Noah Cantor, Toronto Argonauts
DT – Ed Philion, Montreal Alouettes
DE – Tim Cheatwood, Hamilton Tiger-Cats
DE – Anwar Stewart, Montreal Alouettes
LB – Kevin Johnson, Montreal Alouettes
LB – Kevin Eiben, Toronto Argonauts
LB – Tim Strickland, Montreal Alouettes
CB – Almondo Curry, Montreal Alouettes
CB – Davis Sanchez, Montreal Alouettes
DB – Kelly Malveaux, Montreal Alouettes
DB – Clifford Ivory, Toronto Argonauts
DS – Orlondo Steinauer, Toronto Argonauts

Special teams
P – Noel Prefontaine, Toronto Argonauts
K – Noel Prefontaine, Toronto Argonauts[
ST – Bashir Levingston, Toronto Argonauts

2004 CFLPA All-Stars

Offence
QB – Casey Printers, BC Lions
OT – Uzooma Okeke,	Montreal Alouettes
OT – Cory Mantyka,	BC Lions
OG – Andrew Greene, Saskatchewan Roughriders
OG – Dan Comiskey,	Edmonton Eskimos
C – Jamie Crysdale, Calgary Stampeders
RB – Troy Davis, Hamilton Tiger Cats
FB – Julian Radlein, Hamilton Tiger Cats
SB – Geroy Simon, BC Lions
SB – Derrell Mitchell, Edmonton Eskimos
WR – Jason Tucker,	Edmonton Eskimos
WR – David Flick, Hamilton Tiger Cats

Defence
DE – Joe Montford,	Hamilton Tiger Cats
DE – Timothy Cheatwood, Hamilton Tiger Cats
DT – Joe Fleming, Winnipeg Blue Bombers
DT – Nate Davis, Saskatchewan Roughriders
LB – Barrin Simpson, BC Lions
LB – John Grace, Calgary Stampeders
LB – Kevin Johnson, Montreal Alouettes
CB – Malcolm Frank, Edmonton Eskimos
CB – Omarr Morgan,	Saskatchewan Roughriders
HB – Clifford Ivory, Toronto Argonauts
HB – Eddie Davis, Saskatchewan Roughriders
S – Orlondo Steinauer, Toronto Argonauts

Special teams
K – Paul McCallum, Saskatchewan Roughriders
P – Noel Prefontaine, Toronto Argonauts
ST – Keith Stokes, Winnipeg Blue Bombers

Head coach
 Greg Marshall, Hamilton Tiger-Cats

2004 Rogers CFL Awards
CFL's Most Outstanding Player Award – Casey Printers (QB), BC Lions
CFL's Most Outstanding Canadian Award – Jason Clermont (SB), BC Lions
CFL's Most Outstanding Defensive Player Award – Anwar Stewart (DE), Montreal Alouettes
CFL's Most Outstanding Offensive Lineman Award – Gene Makowsky (OT), Saskatchewan Roughriders
CFL's Most Outstanding Rookie Award – Nikolas Lewis (WR), Calgary Stampeders
CFL's Most Outstanding Special Teams Award – Keith Stokes (WR), Winnipeg Blue Bombers
CFLPA's Outstanding Community Service Award – Barron Miles (DB), Montreal Alouettes
Rogers Fans' Choice Award – Danny McManus (QB), Hamilton Tiger-Cats / Anthony Calvillo (QB), Montreal Alouettes
CFL's Coach of the Year – Greg Marshall, Hamilton Tiger-Cats
Commissioner's Award - Russ Jackson, Ottawa Rough Riders

References

CFL
Canadian Football League seasons